James O'Dea may refer to:
Jimmy O'Dea (1899-1965), Irish actor and comedian
Jim O'Dea (born 1949), Australian rules footballer